The Edgewater Hotel and Casino is a casino hotel on the banks of the Colorado River in Laughlin, Nevada, owned and operated by Golden Entertainment.

Facilities

The hotel has 1,053 rooms divided between two towers: a large 26-story tower, Sedona, and a smaller 6-story tower, Santa Fe. There is also a pool and spa, as well as several restaurants.

History
The Edgewater opened in 1981. It initially ran into licensing difficulties when the Nevada Gaming Control Board raised concerns about alleged connections between some partners in the ownership group and members of the Detroit crime family; the rest of the group was forced to buy out their shares.

Circus Circus Enterprises bought the Edgewater in 1983 for $17 million.

Circus Circus was later renamed as Mandalay Resort Group, and was then acquired in 2005 by MGM Mirage. In June 2007, MGM Mirage sold the Edgewater and the Colorado Belle to a partnership of Anthony Marnell III and Sher Gaming for a total of $200 million.

On February 3, 2010, a speeding vehicle crashed into the Edgewater Casino's south entrance, destroying six banks of slot machines and killing two casino patrons and injuring eight. Investigators said that the crash was caused by the driver having a "medical episode".

In January 2019, Golden Entertainment, the owner of the neighboring Aquarius Casino Resort, bought the Edgewater and the Colorado Belle from Marnell and Sher for a total of $190 million.

Amenities

Gaming
The Edgewater has  of gaming space with 755 slot machines, 20 table games, and a race and sports book (Laughlin's largest). The casino has a players' club program that is shared with the Colorado Belle and the Aquarius, TRUE Rewards.

Dining
 Hickory Pit – A steakhouse which serves charbroiled steaks and chops, hickory pit ribs and chicken, pasta and seafood. 
 Denny's – This cafe is open 24 hours
 Grand Buffet – Laughlin's largest buffet features over 150 items
 Fast Food – Capriotti's, Dunkin' Donuts, and P.T's Tavern

Spa
The Edgewater features an outdoor swimming pool and spa; as well as a fitness area. Guests also have access to the Laughlin Riverwalk, jet ski rentals, and river cruises. The Edgewater Salon caters to both men and women with hair and nail services.

Nightlife and Meetings
The Edgewater has a night club, the Edge Lounge, previously known as the Inferno. A wedding chapel is also located on the property.

References

External links
 

1981 establishments in Nevada
Casino hotels
Casinos completed in 1981
Casinos in Laughlin, Nevada
Golden Entertainment
Hotel buildings completed in 1981
Hotels established in 1981
Hotels in Laughlin, Nevada
Mandalay Resort Group
Resorts in Laughlin, Nevada